Dox Thrash (1893–1965) was an African-American artist who was famed as a skilled draftsman, master printmaker, and painter and as the co-inventor of the Carborundum printmaking process. The subject of his artwork was African American life. He served as a printmaker with the W.P.A. at the Fine Print Workshop of Philadelphia. The artist spent much of his career living and working in Philadelphia, Pennsylvania.

Early life

Dox Thrash was born on March 22, 1893 in Griffin, Georgia. He was the second of four children in his family. Thrash left home at the age of fifteen in search of work up north. He was part of the Great Migration (African American) looking for industrial work in the North.

The first job that Thrash got was working with a circus and a Vaudeville act. In 1911, at the age of 18, he moved to Chicago, Illinois. He got a job as an elevator operator during the day, and used this source of income to attend school. In 1914 he attended the School of the Art Institute of Chicago.

In 1917, the United States declared war on Germany and entered World War I. In September 1917, at the age of twenty-four, Thrash enlisted in the army. He was placed in the 365th Infantry Regiment, 183rd Brigade, 92nd Division, also known as the Buffalo Soldiers. During combat, Thrash suffered shell shock and a gas attack, but was not permanently injured.

Career as an artist

After having served in the war, Thrash qualified as a war veteran and enrolled in the Art Institute of Chicago with the support of federal funding. After finishing his education, he traveled intermittently from Georgia to Chicago, Boston, New York, and finally Philadelphia, working odd jobs - experiences that provided him with subject matter to later paint. Settling in Philadelphia by 1925, he took a job working as a janitor. In his free time, he continued his art career and used his talent to create emblems, like for the North Philadelphia Businessmen's Association, and posters in exhibitions and festivals, including the 2nd Annual National Negro Music Festival and the Tra Club of Philadelphia. This gained him local recognition and opened doors for new artistic endeavors. By 1929, Thrash found himself attending nightly classes within these clubs, namely with Earl Horter of the Graphic Sketch Club, now known as the Samuel S. Fleisher Art Memorial.

In 1937 Thrash joined the government-sponsored Works Progress Administration (WPA)'s Federal Art Project. Through the WPA, Thrash began working at the Fine Print Workshop of Philadelphia. At the Fine Print Workshop of Philadelphia, Thrash, along with Michael J. Gallagher and Hugh Mesibov, began experimenting and co-inventing the process of carborundum mezzotint, a printmaking technique. Carborundum printmaking uses a carbon-based abrasive to burnish copper plates creating an image that can produce a print in tones ranging from pale gray to deep black.  The method is similar to the more difficult and complicated mezzotint process developed in the 17th century. He used this as his primary medium for much of his career and created his greatest works with it. One of his first pieces employing this nascent technique was his anonymous self-portrait entitled Mr. X.

With this new technique, the three gained increasing notoriety as they published more and more graphics within newspapers and featured more and more pieces within exhibitions. Their works often featured subtle commentaries about social and economic exploitation regarding the contemporary politics - of the Great Depression and the Second World War. By 1940, Thrash, Gallagher, and Mesibov all began to gain attention in local circles for their carborundum prints, although the role that each artist played in the development of the process was left unclear.

In 1960, Thrash participated in a show at the Pyramid Club, a social organization of Black professional men that held an annual art exhibit starting in 1941. Others on hand were Howard N. Watson, Benjamin Britt, Robert Jefferson and Samuel J. Brown Jr.

Thrash spent the later years of his life mentoring young African American artists. He died on April 19, 1965 in Philadelphia, Pennsylvania. In 2001 he was posthumously honored almost 40 years later with a major retrospective, titled Dox Thrash: An African-American Master Printmaker Rediscovered, at the Philadelphia Museum of Art.

Thrash's work was included in the 2015 exhibition We Speak: Black Artists in Philadelphia, 1920s-1970s at the Woodmere Art Museum.

Relation to Alain Locke and the New Negro Movement

Alain LeRoy Locke (1885-1954) was an intellectual, professor and author who espoused that African Americans, specifically artists, to capture the personality, lives, and essence of their people in The New Negro. He explained “The Negro physiognomy must be freshly and objectively conceived on its own patterns if it is ever to be seriously and importantly interpreted. Art must discover and reveal the beauty which prejudice and caricature have overlaid.” What Locke is expressing here is not only the call for black artists to overcome racial prejudices via positive artistic representations of blacks, but that the actual African American individual like Thrash portrayed the lives of fellow blacks, and had the power to propagate this idea of the New Negro, as Locke explains, “There is the possibility that the sensitive artistic mind of the American Negro, stimulated by a cultural pride and interest, will receive…a profound and galvanizing influence.”

In his shadowy carborundum mezzotint Cabin Days, Thrash depicts a southern black family on the porch of their shack-like home in a rural landscape. The man, woman, and child, clutched tenderly to the female figure's breast, create an intimate scene highlighted by the bright cleanliness of the laundry hanging behind them. Placed in front of the drying laundry, they are framed by one aspect of the hard work accomplished during the day. Close to one another, staring collectively outward at the Southern landscape, they, and their laudable priorities of cleanliness and family, are made the bright focal point in the poor, unstable atmosphere. Such inner warmth is seemingly incompatible with the family's crooked and disheveled surroundings, and their fuzzy appearance with a lack of facial detail makes the scene into a general archetype for rural southern blacks living conditions and qualities. Thrash was referencing an experience common to thousands of black families in rural occupations at the turn of the 20th century, often forced into slavery-like tenant farming as their only means of livelihood in the racist South. The “uneven clapboards, leaning porch, broken shutter, and uprooted fence” are rife with instability, much like the post-slavery economic and social systems of the South, making it clear that for African Americans, “the house is not the home; rather, the figures on the porch represent family unity and continuity”. In this way, Thrash is able to not only champion the positive qualities of blacks in the family setting but underscore this with a symbolic look at their disadvantaged situation, making it all the more impressive that they persevere. Thrash symbolically depicted harsh realities for the African American at this transitional point in history while conferring a sensitive rendering of their humanity, akin to any other race, despite its utter denial by American society.

Through softer tempera washes like A New Day, he literally and figuratively paints a picture of a black family transitioning from the South to the North during the Great Migration, making a hopeful, daring leap to attempt to be equal members of the society that has historically oppressed them. On the left side of the canvas lie muddled farm houses and plow handles, embodiments of their rural life of tedious hard labor behind them, fading to gray. Their hopeful gazes “…convey the optimism of the scores of African Americans who left the countryside to pursue better job opportunities, health care, and education in urban centers”. The stance of the figures, with their chins raised in a dignified gesture towards cityscape ahead suggest a confidence and ambitiousness in their collective futures in this new northern industrial terrain. Even the child, clutched securely in the arm of the mother figure against her breast is not only serenely grinning, but calm enough to appear to gently doze, confident in that the journey ahead will result positively, poses no threat. The exposed arm of the woman is notable as well, being unusually thick and muscular, along with the general proportions of the kneeling father, who position on the ground appears not pleading but rather in a slightly exhausted, but upright gratefulness for the promise ahead. Thrash makes it clear that this family has traveled a long way, but is not depleted; rather they are strong and preparing for further hard work and hopeful success ahead. They are the quintessence of the New Negro, in that they are not only journeying forward to seize previously unobtainable opportunities that will enhance their lives, but the manner with which they hold themselves provokes a certain level of warranted respect for their humanity, from the viewer.

In fact it was the strength of his fellow African Americans that Thrash often emphasized, amongst other positive characteristics in the face of adversity in personal portraits.  Through his carborundum print Life, he depicts a neatly dressed black girl reading what appears to be a newspaper or magazine. The subject stares intently at her material, fixated on the abundance of text. Art historian Richard Powell describes it best, stating that Life's “non-racial genre scene, soft sells that Black children, too, experience the thrills and tender moments of youth. These underlying themes of commonalities and unity contribute to an aesthetic of being part of a larger system as opposed to being separate from it.” Thrash's conscious decision to not only give specific attention to a black subject through a portrait, but to place the child as engaging in an intellectual pursuit that crosses racial borders enforces a positive view of African Americans as intelligent, integral members of society akin to whites. The lighting of the print adds to this effect as well. The room in which the girl sits is dark and shadowy, however, the light source shines directly upon her face and lap, emphasizing her beautifully carved young features engrossed in the reading material. In addition, her social status is touched upon by her clean, well-tailored, and fashionable dress of the day. Her literacy is therefore inextricably interwoven with her personal and familial success. She is the antithesis to Locke's idea of the caricature of blacks whose poses and exaggerated features were made to dehumanize and convey a diminished sense of intelligence and capability.

Thrash also acknowledged common cultural clashes and challenges faced by African Americans through his portraiture as well. In his etching Saturday Night, he depicts a female hairdresser readying herself for a night on the town. Her facial features and coloring distinctly label her as African American, and it is the act she is engaging in that is of utmost importance. The woman is straightening her naturally curly hair with a hot iron. She is conforming to physical standards foisted upon her by the dominant white society where straight hair is a marker of beauty. Though muscular, shapely, and attractive, she feels the need to engage in the laborious task of making her tightly coiled hair straight in order to prepare for the night in the public sphere. In fact, weariness at the task is written all over her face, the scratchy lines of the etching giving heavy shadow to the area underneath her eyes and the lines touching from her nostrils till the outsides of her lips. This technique of etching lends a weariness or faded quality to the entire piece, the woman and her world appearing to be worn down to a mere skeleton of their realities.  Her left leg casually draped across her right and the ease with which she appears to hold the straightening tool signify the routine quality of this preparation, despite her apparent dissatisfaction at the procedure. Throughout all of this, she directly confronts the viewer with a strong gaze, as if the audience is her mirror. It is as if Thrash was literally reflecting his African American audience back at themselves, hinting at the psychological expense of attempting to conform to pre-existing white norms. Such an activity, though on the surface merely a shallow process of beautification, carries with it the idea of rejecting your natural physical state, or rather one's blackness. To Locke and Thrash, this was not viewed as positive for African Americans considering that it the connotation of such an act of conforming to the aesthetic norms of white society puts the natural condition of blacks in a categorization of less than optimal, or ugly. Such a sentiment does not produce pride for the community or bolster the idea of the New Negro. However, Thrash's acknowledgement of the common practice, reflecting it back to the community, is a step towards progressing towards a more positive, independent state.

Relation to W. E. B. Du Bois
In an editorial in the monthly magazine The Crisis, W. E. B. Du Bois, another father of “The New Negro Movement,” said “let us train ourselves to see beauty in black”. Dubois called upon African-Americans to be proud of their heritage instead of being ashamed of their dark skin.  This racial image issue was another characteristic of the African-American experience at this time. Thrash addressed the issue by creating portraits of African-American subjects and ideal heads using his carborundum mezzotint method that defined typically black facial features in a more realistic manner.  At a time when white artists illustrated blacks barbarically in cartoons and newspapers, tasteful portrayals of black subjects were highly influential.

In Thrash's illustration of an African-American woman in his print Marylou, the chiaroscuro effect is extreme.  Unlike some of his prints, there is minimal, visible white space in this print, except for around the subject's head.  Resembling a halo, the light space bordering the woman's head gives the viewer a sense that there is something pure and righteous about her. She is not tainted or inferior as white society might try to imply.  This could be Thrash's attempt to see the beauty in black as W. E. B. Du Bois called upon African-Americans to do in his editorial. Although this painting focuses on an individual, the way that the woman's eyes are illustrated makes her seem as though she is not a specific individual.  Her extremely darkened eyes prevent the reader from identifying a precise woman, which enables the viewer to accept her as a symbol of the beauty of all African-American women.

References

External links 

 Glory Be! Work of Art by Dox Thrash at the Baltimore Museum of Art Website
 Griffin Hills Work of Art by Dox Thrash at the Baltimore Museum of Art Website
 Nursery Rhyme Work of Art by Dox Thrash at the Baltimore Museum of Art Website
African American Registry: Dox Thrash. (2005). Retrieved March 4, 2007.
Dox Thrash. (2003). Philadelphia Museum Store. Retrieved March 4, 2007.
Dox Thrash. (2007). Retrieved March 3, 2007.
Dox Thrash: An African American Master Printmaker Rediscovered. Retrieved March 3, 2007.
Black Printmakers and the WPA. (2007). Retrieved May 2, 2007.
Bearden, Romare, and Harry Henderson. A History of African-American Artists from 1792 to the Present. New York: Pantheon, 1993. 115-146, 243-246.
“Dox Thrash (1893-1965)- Artist and Printmaker: The Unknown Hero from Griffin.” Library.griftec.org. 15 November 2009.
Kennedy, Winston, "Dox Thrash: Out of the Shadows." International Review of African American Art, vol. 15, no. 4 (1999).
Toller, Pamela. “The Life and Work of Dox Thrash: An Expression of Identity.” Teachers.yale.edu. 15 November 2009.
Stuart A. Rose Manuscript, Archives, and Rare Book Library, Emory University: Dox Thrash collection, 1920-1966
Works by Dox Thrash at the Free Library of Philadelphia Digital Collections

See also 
 Samuel Joseph Brown Jr.

1893 births
1965 deaths
20th-century American printmakers
Vaudeville performers
Artists from Georgia (U.S. state)
United States Army personnel of World War I
School of the Art Institute of Chicago alumni
People from Griffin, Georgia
Federal Art Project artists
African-American printmakers
African Americans in World War I
African-American United States Army personnel
20th-century African-American artists